Hello Smile ! or Bonjour sourire, is a French comedy film from 1956, directed by Claude Sautet, written by Jean Marsan, starring Henri Salvador and Louis de Funès. The film is known under the titles "Die tolle Residenz" (West Germany), "Sourire aux lèvres" (Belgium French title).

Plot 
The small principality of Monte Marino is in turmoil: the gloom of the heir to the throne, the Princess Aline, is the cause. The Prime Minister would like to see her smile, which would promote his advances to her and allow him to consider the crown. Despite all the subterfuges, Aline is not brightens. It will take four Parisian fantasy, Jimmy Gaillard, Annie Cordy, Henri Salvador and Christian Duvaleix, join forces to back the joy in the heart of the princess.

Cast

References

External links 
 
 Bonjour sourire (1955) at the Films de France

1956 films
French comedy films
1950s French-language films
French black-and-white films
Films directed by Claude Sautet
1956 comedy films
1950s French films

ru:Банда отца (фильм)